Lungotevere (Italian for Tiber Waterfront) is an alley or boulevard running along the river Tiber within the city of Rome.
The building of the Lungoteveres required the demolition of the former edifices along the river banks and the construction of retaining walls called muraglioni (massive walls).

History 
The Lungoteveres were built with the main goal to eliminate and dam the overflows of the Tiber, due to its recurring floods.
The Lungoteveres, inspired by the example of Paris, were designed by the engineer Raffaele Canevari, who managed to rescue the Tiber Island adding artificial rapids to the right branch of the Tiber below the Pons Caestius.

Many artistically and historically significant buildings, structures and churches were demolished for the construction: among them, Palazzo Altoviti, the Teatro Apollo at Tor di Nona, Sant'Anna dei Bresciani, the Ripetta Harbour, the Roman Pons Cestius (pulled down and rebuilt with wider side arches), the already damaged Roman Ponte Rotto (of which only one arch remains), some minor gates of the Aurelian Walls flanking the left bank. The Ponte Sant'Angelo was widened too, adding two more arches. Along with these structures, the erection of the Lungotevere provoked the loss of one of the most picturesque environments of the city.

The works began in 1876 and were completed in 1926; in the circumstance, several bridges were built, linking the two banks of the Tiber.

List of the Lungotevere 
The list is in geographic order, from upstream to downstream.

Right bank 

The stretch between Lungotevere Ripa and lungotevere Portuense is named Porto di Ripa Grande (rione Trastevere).
In the quarter Portuense, a stretch of the Lungotevere della Magliana is flanked by Riva Pian Due Torri.

Left bank 

The stretch between Lungotevere Testaccio and Lungotevere San Paolo is named Riva Ostiense (quarter Ostiense).

Notes

Sources

External links